George Papageorgiou (born c. 1958) is an American football coach and former player.  He is an assistant coach at Benedictine College.  Papageorgiou served as the head football coach at Bethel College in North Newton, Kansas, from 1995 to 1999, compiling a record of 18–29.

Playing career
Papageorgiou played college football at the University of Washington as a fullback.  He played under head coach Don James and saw action in 11 games for the 1978 season—gaining 75 yards on 87 attempts while scoring five touchdowns.

Coaching career

Assistant coaching
Papageorgiou was an assistant coach at Washington until 1983, working with both running backs and the defensive line.  Before taking the head coach position at Bethel he was an assistant for the Willamette Bearcats in Salem, Oregon.  He presently is an assistant coach at Benedictine in Atchison, Kansas.

Bethel
Papageorgiou was the head football coach at Bethel College in North Newton, Kansas, serving for five seasons, from 1995 until 1999, and compiling a record of 18–29. He was named Kansas Collegiate Athletic Conference (KCAC) Coach of the Year in 1996 after leading Bethel to an overall record of 7–3 and a second-place finish in the KCAC with a conference mark of 7–1. Bethel went 5–5 in 1998, but was forced to forfeit all five of those victories in 1999 when it was discovered that an ineligible player has participated during the season. Papageorgiou resigned midway through the 1999 season, on November 3, and was replaced by Mike Moore on an interim basis.

Head coaching record

Notes

References

1950s births
Living people
American football fullbacks
Benedictine Ravens football coaches
Bethel Threshers football coaches
Lewis & Clark Pioneers football coaches
Pacific Boxers football coaches
Portland State Vikings football coaches
Washington Huskies football players
Willamette Bearcats football coaches